Dano Cerny is a MTV Music Video Award nominated music video director, known for his collaborations with musicians such as LSD (Labrinth, Sia & Diplo),  The Chainsmokers, Halsey, Elle King, Galantis, Wrabel, Bebe Rexha, The Roots,  and Bishop Briggs among others.

Music videography

References

Year of birth missing (living people)
Living people
American music video directors